Saint-Nicolas-de-Redon (literally Saint-Nicolas of Redon) is a commune in the Loire-Atlantique department in western France.

The surrounding communities are Avessac and Fégréac in Loire-Atlantique, Rieux and Saint-Jean-la-Poterie in Morbihan, Redon and Sainte-Marie in Ille-et-Vilaine.

See also
Communes of the Loire-Atlantique department

References

Saintnicolasderedon